Sertã is a municipality in Castelo Branco District in Portugal. The population in 2011 was 15,880, in an area of 446.73 km2.

The present mayor is José Farinha Nunes, elected by the PSD. The municipal holiday is the June 24.

General information
Local sports club: Sertanense Futebol Clube (mainly devoted to soccer, playing (2004-2005) the 3rd Division Championship).

Local newspaper: A Comarca da Sertã (weekly)

Parishes

Administratively, the municipality is divided into 10 civil parishes (freguesias):

{| class="wikitable sortable"
!Parish name
!Population (2011)
!Area km2
|- 
|Cabeçudo
|align="right"|957
|align="right"|10.39
|-
|Carvalhal
|align="right"|465
|align="right"|10.02
|-   
|Castelo
|align="right"|1,046 
|align="right"|24.57
|-
|Cernache do Bonjardim, Nesperal e Palhais
|align="right"|3,625 
|align="right"|101.58  
|-
|Cumeada e Marmeleiro
|align="right"|731
|align="right"|51.73
|-
|Ermida e Figueiredo
|align="right"|423
|align="right"|42.74
|-  
|Pedrógão Pequeno
|align="right"|753
|align="right"|36.86
|-
|Sertã
|align="right"|6,196 
|align="right"|80.95
|- 
|Troviscal
|align="right"|864 
|align="right"|53.37
|-
|Várzea dos Cavaleiros
|align="right"|820
|align="right"|34.51
|}

Notable people 
 Nuno Álvares Pereira (born 1360 in Cernache de Bonjardim - 1431) a Portuguese general, he became a mystic and was beatified by Pope Benedict XV, in 1918, and canonised by Pope Benedict XVI in 2009
 João Castel-Branco Goulão (born 1954 in Cernache do Bonjardim) a physician and the current national drug coordinator for Portugal

References

Populated places in Castelo Branco District
Municipalities of Castelo Branco District
People from Sertã